Keith Gee is an Australian former professional rugby league footballer who played in the 1980s and 1990s. He played as a forward in 12 games for the Brisbane Broncos from 1988 to 1989, including their first ever match. He also represented Queensland in a tour match against New Zealand in 1987.

Gee is the brother of four time Broncos premiership player Andrew Gee and former Gold Coast Seagulls player Mark Gee.

Playing career
Gee made his first grade debut for Brisbane in Round 1, 1988 against Brisbane in the club's inaugural game as the Broncos defeated Manly-Warringah 44–10. Gee scored his only try for Brisbane the following week in a 20–18 victory over Penrith.

In 1989, Gee joined the Gold Coast and played with the club for three seasons. His last season with the Gold Coast ended with a wooden spoon in 1991, with his final game in first grade being a 32–10 loss against North Sydney at North Sydney Oval.

Career Stats

Post playing
Gee contested the 2009 Queensland state election in the seat of Beaudesert as an independent candidate. He was not elected, finishing in fourth place on the first preference count with 7.8% of the votes.

In 2016, Gee was appointed coach of the Beaudesert Kingfishers.

References

External links
Statistics at rugbyleagueproject.org

Australian rugby league players
Brisbane Broncos players
Living people
Gold Coast Chargers players
1963 births
Place of birth missing (living people)
Rugby league second-rows
Rugby league props